Bruce West was a federal electoral district  in Ontario, Canada, that was represented in the House of Commons of Canada from 1882 to 1904. This riding was created in 1882 from parts of Bruce North and Bruce South ridings.

The West Riding of the county of Bruce initially consisted of the townships of Saugeen, Bruce, Kincardine, Huron and Kinloss, the town of Kincardine, the village of Tiverton and the village of Lucknow. In 1892, it was expanded to include the village of Port Elgin.

The electoral district was abolished in 1903 when it was redistributed between Bruce North and Bruce South ridings.

Election results

|}

|}

On Mr. Blake's resignation to sit for Durham West:

|}

|}

|}

|}

See also 

 List of Canadian federal electoral districts
 Past Canadian electoral districts

External links 
Riding history from the Library of Parliament

Former federal electoral districts of Ontario